The 2021 New Zealand Warriors season is the 27th in the club's history and they are competing in the 2021 NRL season. The team is coached by Nathan Brown, coaching the club for his 1st season ever. On 1 February 2017, the Warriors announced that Roger Tuivasa-Sheck would now be captain of the team, this is his 5th consecutive season as captain.

Fixtures

Pre-season

Regular season

Ladder

Transfers/Signings
Source:

In

Out

Future Confirmed Signings

Future Confirmed Departures

References

New Zealand Warriors seasons